Turtle Creek is a stream in the U.S. state of South Dakota.

Turtle Creek once was the natural habitat of turtles, hence the name.

See also
List of rivers of South Dakota

References

Rivers of Beadle County, South Dakota
Rivers of Hand County, South Dakota
Rivers of Spink County, South Dakota
Rivers of South Dakota